Grizzly Bear Creek is a stream in Alberta, Canada.

Grizzly Bear Creek's name is an accurate preservation of its native Creek name, mist-a-ya.

See also
List of rivers of Alberta

References

Rivers of Alberta